Gino Munaron (born 2 April 1928 – died 22 November 2009) was a racing driver from Italy.  He participated in 4 Formula One World Championship Grands Prix, debuting on 7 February 1960. He scored no championship points.

Complete Formula One World Championship results
(key)

References

Italian racing drivers
Italian Formula One drivers
1928 births
2009 deaths
24 Hours of Le Mans drivers
World Sportscar Championship drivers
People from Valenza
Sportspeople from the Province of Alessandria